Þingvellir (anglicised as Thingvellir) was the site of the Alþing, the annual parliament of Iceland from the year 930 until the last session held at  in 1798. Since 1881, the parliament has been located within Alþingishúsið in Reykjavík.

The park lies in a rift valley that marks the crest of the Mid-Atlantic Ridge and the boundary between the North American and Eurasian tectonic plates.

 National Park was founded in 1930, marking the 1000th anniversary of the Althing. The park was later expanded to protect the diverse and natural phenomena in the surrounding area, and was designated as a World Heritage Site in 2004.

Toponymy
A thing was a form of governing assembly found in Germanic societies, and a tradition that endures to this day in one form or another across Northern Europe.

Although the name  is plural, the older form  is singular, and the modern singular form  can still be heard.

The name is most commonly anglicised as Thingvellir, and might appear as Tingvellir, Thingvalla or Tingvalla in other languages. The spelling Pingvellir is also seen, although the letter “p” does not correspond to the letter “þ” (thorn), which is pronounced , like the th in thirst.

Dingwall and Tingwall in Scotland, Thingwall in England, Tynwald on the Isle of Man, Dinklage in Germany, and Tingvoll in Norway bear names of the same root and meaning.

History
 became a national park as a result of legislation passed in 1928 to protect the remains of the parliament site, thus creating the first national park in Iceland. The park was decreed "a protected national shrine for all Icelanders, the perpetual property of the Icelandic nation under the preservation of parliament, never to be sold or mortgaged."

Founding of Iceland's parliament

According to the Book of Settlements, the settlement of Iceland began in 874, when the Norwegian chieftain  became the first permanent Norwegian settler on the island. Over the next centuries, people of Norse and Celtic origin settled in Iceland.  Early on, district assemblies were formed, but as the population grew, there was a need for a general assembly.  The descendants of Ingólfur who dominated the region of southwest Iceland had become the most powerful family in the country, and other chieftains felt a need for a general assembly to limit their power.

 was allotted the role of rallying support and finding a suitable location for the assembly. His land was declared public, and then obligated to be used for assembly proceedings, and the building of temporary dwellings, and the forest to be used for kindling and the grazing of horses. The  area was chosen for this reason and for its accessibility to the most populous regions of the north, south and west.

The foundation of the Icelandic parliament is said to be the founding of the nation of Iceland, and the first parliamentary proceedings in the summer of 930 laid the ground for a common cultural heritage and national identity.  played a central role in the history of the country, and its history runs almost parallel with the history of the Icelandic Commonwealth.

From commonwealth to foreign rule

The Lawspeaker, elected for three years at a time, presided over the assembly and recited the law of the land. Anyone attending the assembly was entitled to present his case on important issues from the Lögberg.

The Law Council served as both parliament and supreme court. Laws were passed and approved there, and rulings made on points of law. The Law Council appointed members of the Fifth Court (a kind of appellate court) and the Lawspeaker, and took part in the election of the bishop. However, everyone at the assembly was entitled to watch and listen to the Law Council at work.

The  was Iceland's legislative and chief judicial authority for the duration of the Commonwealth, until 1271. Executive power was in the hands of the chieftains and parties to individual cases. This proved to be quite an adequate arrangement for as long as the balance of power remained, but flaws emerged when it was disrupted.

In the final decades of the Commonwealth, there were clashes between chieftain families, which resulted in Iceland coming under the Norwegian crown.

Social centre

 was the centre of Icelandic culture.

They set up temporary dwellings (pl.  ) with walls of turf and rock and temporary roofing of homespun cloth, and stayed in them for the two weeks of the assembly.

Merchants, sword-sharpeners, and tanners would sell their goods and services, entertainers performed, and ale-makers brewed drinks for the assembly guests. News was told from distant parts; games and feasts were held. Young people met to make their plans, no less than leading national figures and experts in law. Itinerant farmhands looked for work and vagrants begged.  was a meeting place for everyone in Iceland, laying the foundation for the language and literature that have been a prominent part of people's lives right up to the present day.

Nationalist symbol 
During the 19th century,   emerged as a nationalist symbol. According to Icelandic political scientist , "Thingvellir can be likened to a church or building which serves as a pilgrimage destination and as a site for the nation-state’s ritual ceremonies."

Geology

 is notable for its unusual tectonic and volcanic environment in a rift valley.

The continental drift between the North American and Eurasian Plates can be clearly seen in the cracks or faults which traverse the region, the largest one, being a veritable canyon. This also causes the often measurable earthquakes in the area.

Some of the rifts are full of clear water. One, was bridged for the occasion of the visit of King Frederick VIII of Denmark in 1907. On this occasion, visitors began to throw coins from the bridge into the fissure, a tradition based on European legends.

On the lake's northern shore the Silfra fissure is a popular diving and snorkelling tour location.

 was designated a UNESCO World Heritage Site based on cultural criteria. It may also qualify on geological criteria in the future, as there has been ongoing discussion of a possible "serial trans-boundary nomination" for the Mid-Atlantic Ridge, which would include other sites in the Atlantic such as Pico Island.

Art 

The National Gallery of Iceland owns more than 150 paintings by  that have  as their subject.  grew popular among artists because not only for its natural environment, but also because it was close to the capital of Iceland,  and thus relatively inexpensive to travel there.

Tourism

 National Park is popular with tourists, and is one of the three key attractions within the famous Golden Circle. There is an information centre near the camping grounds. There are hiking trails, such as the Execution Trail and the nearby Leggjabrjótur . Scuba diving has also become popular at Silfra Lake as the continental drift between the tectonic plates made it wide enough for divers to enjoy unparalleled visibility.

Related places

Culturally related places

Things (assemblies)
 , one of the first Norwegian legislative assemblies and one of the present-day law courts of western Norway.
 Tynwald, the legislature of the Isle of Man.

Cognate toponyms
 Dingwall, a royal burgh in the Scottish Highlands.
 Thingwall, a village in Wirral, England.
 Tingwall, a parish in Shetland.
 Tingvoll, a town in Norway.

Geologically related places
 Gough and Inaccessible Islands in the South Atlantic.
 Pico Island in the Azores.

Trivia
 The Thingvalla Line, a Danish shipping company active between 1879 and 1898, was named after . At its peak, the company had ten ships in its fleet, one of which was named the S/S Thingvalla, launched in 1873. The company operated four other ships which bore Icelandic names, namely the S/S Geiser, S/S Island and two vessels named S/S Hekla.

See also

Notes and references

Notes

References

External links

 
 UNESCO World Heritage listing
 Photogallery by islandsmyndir.is
  Photo
 Andy Carvin's Thingvellir Gallery
 Photos from www.icelandportfolio.com
  Scuba Diving in between the continents in Thingvellir National Park
  Thingvellir National Park

 
Tingvellir
Tingvellir
Tingvellir
Tingvellir
Thing (assembly)
World Heritage Sites in Iceland
Protected areas established in 1930
1930 establishments in Iceland
Ping
Cenozoic rifts and grabens